Bethenia Angelina Owens-Adair (February 7, 1840 – September 11, 1926) was an American social reformer, advocate for eugenics, and one of the first female physicians in Oregon.

Early life

Bethenia Owens was born on February 7, 1840, in Van Buren County, Missouri. She was the second of nine children born to Tom and Sarah Damron Owens. At the age of three, the family, consisting at the time of Tom, Sarah, Bethenia, and her two siblings, Diana and Flem, left their home to settle the American West. The family traveled to the Oregon Country via the Oregon Trail in 1843 with the Jesse Applegate wagon train. The family settled in the Clatsop Plains and later moved to Roseburg in the Umpqua Valley.

Owens' parents were successful homesteaders, focusing their business primarily on cattle. Throughout Owens' life, her parents lent financial aid and support to their children. According to Owens' memoir, her father came to Oregon with 50 cents, which he grew to twenty-thousand dollars within the course of a few years.

From 1843 to 1853, the growing family resided in the Clatsop Plains region, living and working cattle herds on their 640 acres of land. During this period of her life, Owens often served as the family nurse and nanny, taking care of her siblings, and helping with work around the farm. It was during this first thirteen years of her life that she gained many essential skills such as horseback riding, cooking, sewing, cattle rearing, and general homemaking.

In 1853, the family moved south to Roseburg, in Umpqua County, Oregon. During the winter of that year, a former farmhand of Tom Owens, LeGrande Henderson Hill, visited. He spoke to Owens’ parents and requested their daughter's hand in marriage, to which they consented. Plans were made for the couple to be married the spring of the following year.

First marriage 
Bethenia Owens, age 14, and Legrande Hill, in his early 20's, were married on May 4, 1851. It was a small ceremony attended only by their close family and officiating pastor. Owen's dowry, a typical custom at the time, included her horse, Queen, several cows, fabric, and furniture. Shortly after their marriage, the couple moved onto a 320-acre tract of land which Hill purchased on credit, a few miles from Owen's family home. The couple began to build a home together on their land; however, it was never fully completed. Hill spent his time and energy hunting or reading, rather than prioritizing the project. Although a carpenter by skill, Hill never settled into a career. This led the couple into financial difficulty, with Hill eventually selling all of Owen's dowry, excluding the horse. They were forced to sell their property and incomplete cabin back to the previous owner and at the request of Hills’ parents, the couple moved to Yreka, California in 1856, where they purchased a small property so Hill could join the California Gold Rush.

On April 17, 1856, Owens gave birth to her first child, George Owens at the age of 16. A family member in California, Aunt Kelly, offered to adopt the boy and raise him as her own, but Owens refused. It was around this time that Owens and Hill's relationship began to decline. On multiple occasions her husband beat their son, and purportedly choked her. This led Owens to seek for a divorce. Owens’ mother supported her decision, while her father wished she try to save her marriage. Faced with possible social dishonor caused by divorce and her father's advice, she agreed and returned to Hill. Owen's father even offered to support their move back to Oregon, in addition to giving them an acre of land, so they could be closer to family. Owens and Hill accepted the help and agreed to move back.

The two moved back to Oregon, but rather than investing in the land, Hill instead went into business with a bricklayer, an endeavor he was advised against by both the family and Owens. The venture was unsuccessful, and Owens and George were forced to live in a tent during this time. The poor living conditions led her to contract Typhoid Fever. Her parents took her and George back into their home and helped nurse her back to health. This incident resulted in an argument between Owens’ parents and Hill. Tom Owens wanted to write the deed for the acre in his daughter's name, rather than Hill's, which created tension in the relationship. Not long after, another incident of abuse occurred between Hill and George which resulted in Owens leaving to return to her parents’ home. This decision was ultimately supported by her parents. Hill attempted to reconcile the relationship on multiple occasions, but Owens refused him and the two were officially divorced in 1859. Bethenia was 18 years old at the time.

Early education 
In 1858, when Owens was 18-years old, she returned to school. During the early period of her life, Owens was unable to attend official schooling. The family did host a traveling teacher, Mr. Beaufort, for several months where she learned basic literacy skills. Besides taking part in Beaufort's three month long primary school course though, her education was limited. Due to this long break in her education, she was required to attend primary school alongside young children. Despite being significantly older than her classmates, being previously married, and having a child, she was determined to learn and become educated. Frustrated by being unable to read, write, and provide for herself and her son, Owens became an ambitious student. Owens, being a single mother after her divorce with Hill was in a unique situation, and rather than have her parents support her, she chose to study to support herself. After completing the beginning courses, she continued her education in Astoria with her son and nephew, Frank. Upon finishing these classes, Owens had accumulated roughly eight years of schooling.

Career
Owens provided for herself and her son by performing a variety of jobs. Although her family, especially her father, tried to support her and her child, Bethenia refused and took it upon herself to make a living, despite being a woman. Initially she found work nursing the sick, ironing, washing, and cooking, however, as she became more devoted to school, she decided to take up teaching. While visiting her sister Diana and brother in-law, John, she asked to begin a school in Clatsop. Sixteen students showed up on the first day of a three-month term.

She eventually moved to a primary school teaching position. She proved to be a worthy person for the position as she was able to deal with disruptive children in an effective manner and gained the reputation of a good teacher. While teaching she continued her own studies along with side jobs, such as sewing, to accumulate savings. She eventually was able to save enough to build a house in Astoria. However, in 1865, as her reputation as a teacher spread, she was offered a position in a different area. Rather than leave her home, Owens decided that teaching was no longer financially practical and began to consider other lines of employment.

It was also at this time Owens was forced to leave Astoria because her former husband, LeGrand Hill, showed up seeking to reconcile their relationship once again. Feeling threatened, she left her home in Astoria and went to her parents in Roseburg, Oregon. Owens decided to stay with her parents, however, she still needed employment. Her brother-in-law suggested she take up millinery. Owens knew nothing about millinery, however, determined to teach herself the practice, she decided to open her own hat shop. Her shop was successful until Mrs. Jane Stokes opened a competing hat shop across the street. To stay in business and keep up with trends, Owens traveled to San Francisco to receive training from Madame Fouts, a qualified milliner. When Owens returned to Roseburg, she was able to reclaim many of her clients and maintain her business.

Eventually, Owens became uninterested in millinery and desired to return to school. While assisting a doctor she realized that she was capable, if not more, than the physician she was helping. Realizing her desire to become a doctor, she was ready to face the opposition and disapproval to achieve her goal.

During the 19th and 20th centuries, the medical field was considered a man's job and women were excluded from the profession. It was not permissible for women to see and touch corpses which was a requirement for doctors. However, despite the prejudice, Owens announced her intentions to attend medical school in Philadelphia to her family. Her family, including her son, were not initially supportive of her ambitions. Nevertheless, Owens left to the East coast determined to attend medical school. It was through the efforts of exceptional women like Owens, Elizabeth Blackwell, the Hunt sisters, among others, that women forced their way into the medical profession.

Medical school 
In 1871, at age 31, Owens left Oregon to pursue an education in medicine in Philadelphia. She initially attempted to seek admission to Jefferson College, however, since they had never accepted a woman before, they rejected her admittance. Owens, determined to become a doctor, resorted to the Philadelphia Eclectic School. However, Bethenia did not have enough experience to be accepted, thus that summer she attended tutoring session with Dr. Samuels. From these summer classes she gained the necessary experience to apply to the Philadelphia Eclectic School and be admitted. After a year of studying, Owens graduated from Philadelphia Eclectic School and returned to Oregon to start a practice. She received major backlash in Roseburg for being a female physician and was forced to begin a practice in Portland, nevertheless, she became one of the first medically trained female doctors in the west.

Medicine in the west was unique due to its isolated nature. Medical professionals were typically creative and resourceful. In the traditional western medical way, Owens was innovative and determined. During her years practicing, she implemented asepsis, a new method popularized by Dr. Lister which focused on germ theory and the sterilization of medical implements and places. She also used the practice of medical baths, a method she learned from her time at the Eclectic School.

In 1877, after years practicing medicine, Owens sought for more knowledge and concluded she would return to medical school to be trained as a surgeon. She returned to the East Coast with letters of recommendation in hopes to finally be admitted to Jefferson College, however, once again she was denied on account of her gender. At the recommendation of Dr. Samuel David Gross, she applied to The University of Michigan at Ann Arbor and was admitted to the two-year surgical program. Owens used this time to become as educated on the human body as possible.

In June 1880, Owens graduated with a degree in medicine and surgery. With this new degree, Owens was able to return to her practice in Oregon and perform surgical procedures. She also specialized in diseases of the eyes and ears. Owens’ medical knowledge and excellence led her to gain a reputation as a doctor in Oregon and people traveled from all around Oregon to seek her aid. She continued her practice, which moved to Yakima, WA for several years, until she shut her practice in 1905, after 33 years in the profession.

Single motherhood
The period of Owens's life between her first divorce and beginning her eventual career was a difficult one. Though she legally changed her name back to her maiden name, there was serious stigma at the time for divorced women, especially if the divorce was not the direct result of adultery.  Options for a working mother were limited socially. However, despite prejudice, Owens found work teaching, starting her own milliner business, eventually becoming a doctor, along with other odd jobs to support herself and her son.

In the decades between her first and second marriages, Bethenia made active steps to ensure the success of her son, George. She enrolled him in the University of California in Berkeley when he was 16. Then, at age 18, she enrolled him at the medical school at Willamette University, in Oregon. Owens also took herself and George on a long vacation to Europe to travel and study under the most successful surgeons and doctors of the time. Upon their return to the states, George was married and continued to have a successful career as a doctor.

In addition to George, Owens adopted a second child from a dying patient. Similarly with her son George, Owens worked to ensure that the child, a young girl named Mattie, could be successful. She put Mattie through schooling, helped train her in millinery, and supported her to also become a doctor. The two had a very close relationship, and there were long periods during her life that Mattie lived and worked under Owens. Unfortunately, Mattie died in her early 30's, which devastated Owens. Owens in turn adopted Mattie's son, Victor Adair Hill, and raised him to adulthood as well.

Later life

Second marriage 
Bethenia Owens, at age 44, married her second husband, Colonel John Adair, a graduate of West Point, on July 24, 1884. The two had met as children but rekindled a relationship after meeting again as adults. Adair was a widower, and the two had a brief courtship before being married in the First Congregational Church of Portland, Oregon. Adair was a land developer and farmer by trade, but throughout the marriage, Owens was the primary breadwinner, and handled the family finances.

In 1887, three years into the marriage, Owens and Adair conceived and began preparing for raising their first biological child together. Owens gave birth to a daughter, who died merely three days after birth. This was a particularly difficult time for Owens. Adair was away from home helping to settle land on the coast while Owens was alone in the wake of the death of their daughter. Owens packed up and moved to Astoria, to be closer to Adair, and continued her career there for two years. However, concerns began to grow due to complications with Owens health on account of contracting Typhus Fever.

Her husband urged that they move to a farm in the country around Astoria, Oregon. Owens agreed and the two moved onto the farm on July 1, 1888, where they lived for the next 11 years. This initially proved to have a positive impact on her health, which steadily improved, but made her work as a doctor more difficult. The frontier conditions, weather, lack of transport, and distance from the farm made it difficult to reach patients. Despite the adverse circumstances, she continued to travel regularly to and from the farm to practice medicine. She also made regular summer visits to practice medicine in Seaside, Oregon.

Though Owens and Adair never had any other biological children during their marriage together, the two did raise a son, which once again was adopted from a patient. They named the boy John Adair Jr. and successfully reared him to adulthood as they had the other children. In total, between her two marriages and time as a single mother, Owens raised four children, as well as helped support her siblings, grandchildren, nieces, and nephews in their education and endeavors throughout their lives.

In 1898, the combination of the physical strain of travel and farm work, as well as the wet climate, led to Owens suffering from the effects of Rheumatism. Her son, George, advised that she move to a drier climate. Owens and Adair rented out the farm in Astoria and moved to Yakima, Washington. The shift in environment did seem to improve her condition significantly, and she continued to practice medicine, attend schooling in Chicago, and writing during this time. Her work began to take priority as her business expanded, and Adair and John moved back to manage the farm in Oregon, so that she could focus on her responsibilities. She continued to travel and work, spending time with various family members and returning to live during the summer months on the coast with Adair for the remainder of their marriage.

Death
Owens died September 11, 1926, in Clatsop County. She was 85 and died of an inflamed heart lining. She is buried at Ocean View Cemetery, in Astoria, Oregon.

Legacy 
Bethenia Owens-Adair was the first doctor to earn an M.D. and practice medicine in Oregon and maintained a successful practice for over 30 years. She also was involved in politics, legislation, and writing, authoring several books and memoirs.One of Owens’ works was Human Sterilization:  Social and Legislative Aspects. Owens focused her retirement years on promoting the eugenics movement and human sterilization. Owens became interested in this idea years earlier when she went to the Oregon State Insane Asylum. She chose to wait to promote these ideas until her retirement because she knew how controversial they were, and she did not want to hurt the practice she had worked so hard to create. She wrote articles on mental health for newspapers and in 1907 she began the battle to legalize human sterilization of the mentally insane in Oregon. Despite this bill being dismissed and defeated in 1907, 1909, and 1911 she continued her fight. In 1913 she found success, House Bill 69, or the Lewelling Sterilization Bill, which “targeted, criminals, epileptics, insane and feeble-minded persons’” passed the Oregon House of Representatives, nevertheless, it received significant opposition in the State Senate.  Despite the opposition, on February 18, 1913, Governor Oswald West signed House Bill 69. The Anti-sterilization League formed after the passing of this act. House Bill 69 was soon overturned, and a revised eugenics bill was passed in 1917, however it was repealed in 1921, amended in 1923 and eventually dismantled in 1983. Nevertheless, Owens was called the "pioneer advocate" of the Pacific Northwest eugenic sterilization movement. 

In addition, Owens contributed to Women's Suffrage and the temperance movement. Owens believed women should vote and she occasionally wrote articles for the New Northwest Newspaper about the topic. Owens worked alongside well-known reformers such as Abigail Scott Duniway and Susan B. Anthony, the latter even supported Owens’ ambition to become a doctor.

References

Further reading

External links

Bethenia Owens-Adair – (1840–1926) in the Oregon Encyclopedia
November 20, 1873, letter from Jesse Applegate to Bethenia Owens-Adair from the Oregon Historical Society
Dr. Owens-Adair on Eugenics from the Oregon State Hospital
 
 It Happened Here column in the Yakima Herald 2021

Physicians from Oregon
People from Clatsop County, Oregon
People from Roseburg, Oregon
1840 births
1926 deaths
University of Michigan alumni
American social reformers
People from Yreka, California
People from Cass County, Missouri
19th-century American physicians
20th-century American physicians
Physicians from California
Physicians from Missouri
20th-century American women physicians
19th-century American women physicians